is a professional Japanese baseball player. He plays pitcher for the Hokkaido Nippon-Ham Fighters.

References 

1996 births
Living people
Baseball people from Yamagata Prefecture
Japanese baseball players
Nippon Professional Baseball pitchers
Hokkaido Nippon-Ham Fighters players